Ruben Riccioli (Rome, 9 February 1992) is an Italian rugby union player. His usual position is as a Flanker and he currently plays for Lazio in Top12. 

For 2014–15 Pro12 season, he named as Additional Player for Zebre in Pro 14.

In 2011 and 2012, Riccioli was named in the Italy Under 20 squad.

References 

It's Rugby England Profile
Ultimate Rugby Profile

1992 births
Living people
Italian rugby union players
Rugby union flankers
Zebre Parma players
Mogliano Rugby players
S.S. Lazio Rugby 1927 players